The Pacific College of Health and Science (previously the Pacific College of Oriental Medicine) is a private for-profit college of alternative medicine in the United States with campuses in San Diego, New York, and Chicago.

History
In 1986, the California Acupuncture College (CAC) in San Diego closed, leaving many acupuncture students adrift, as it was the only acupuncture school in the city. Joseph Lazzaro, Richard Gold, Ana de Vedia, and Alex Tiberi, all former administrators or faculty of the CAC, founded Pacific College to ensure that the stranded CAC students could complete their studies and take the California licensing exam. In 1988, Jack Miller, a graduate of the last 1986 class of the California Acupuncture College, was hired and made a full partner to aid in the college's drive towards accreditation.

Academics 
The college is institutionally accredited by the WASC Senior College and University Commission and programmatically accredited by the Accreditation Commission for Acupuncture and Oriental Medicine (ACAOM).

References

External links 
 

For-profit universities and colleges in the United States
Traditional Chinese medicine
Educational institutions established in 1986
1986 establishments in California
Universities and colleges in Chicago
Private universities and colleges in Illinois